Lake Siskiyou is a reservoir formed by Box Canyon Dam on the Sacramento River, in far northern California, near the town of Mt. Shasta, California.  It is the site of local recreation, as well as being used for watershed protection and flood control.

Wagon Creek Bridge
In late 2010 a walking bridge over the wagon creek inlet was completed, finishing a trail that wraps around the entire lake. The cost of the bridge was $2.8 million; funding was obtained from the McConnell Foundation, The State of California and federal stimulus funds. The McConnell Foundation also provided funds for the Sundial Bridge in Redding, California.

See also
List of dams and reservoirs in California
List of lakes in California

References

Mount Shasta
Siskiyou
Siskiyou
Sacramento River
Siskiyou